Hirotsugu Inanami (born 1 December 1908, date of death unknown) was a Japanese equestrian. He competed in two events at the 1936 Summer Olympics.

References

External links
 

1908 births
Year of death missing
Japanese male equestrians
Olympic equestrians of Japan
Equestrians at the 1936 Summer Olympics
Place of birth missing